Parti des Travailleurs may refer to:

Workers' Party (Algeria)
Workers' Party (France)
Workers' Party (Togo)
Tunisian Workers Party